Pseudoprumna baldensis is a monotypic species of grasshopper in the subfamily Melanoplinae and tribe Podismini.

Description
Pseudoprumna baldensis is a stockily built, light green grasshopper. A dark band runs from the eye over the tympanal organ to the end of the abdomen. The band is often reduced to a number of spots. Legs and hearing organ are mainly murky reddish grey. Wings do not exist. The hearing organ is well developed.

Distribution and mode of life
This species is endemic to the Italian Alps. The latter occurrences were first discovered in 1992 by Adolf Nadig. The habitat consists of alpine meadows where this species is found on dwarf shrubs and in grass often in high density. Adults can be found in August and September.

References

Acrididae
Endemic fauna of Italy
Insects described in 1883
Taxa named by Hermann August Krauss
Orthoptera of Europe